Alex Mark Nicholson (born May 2, 1990) is an American professional mixed martial artist formally competing in the heavyweight division of the Professional Fighters League. A professional competitor since 2014, he has competed for the UFC and Legacy Fighting Alliance.

Background
Born and raised in Apopka, Florida, Nicholson played basketball growing up before being introduced to martial arts and boxing. In boxing, he was a Florida Golden Gloves Champion, as well as a state amateur Muay Thai champion, in which he was undefeated.

Mixed martial arts career

Early career
After an amateur career in 2012 and 2013 where he held a record of 4-7, Nicholson made his professional MMA debut in February 2014. He amassed a record of 6 wins against 1 loss before signing with the Ultimate Fighting Championship.

Ultimate Fighting Championship
Nicholson made his UFC debut on February 6, 2016 at UFC Fight Night: Hendricks vs. Thompson. He faced Misha Cirkunov on the card and lost the fight via submission in the second round. 

In his second fight for the promotion, Nicholson faced  Devin Clark in a Middleweight bout at UFC Fight Night: McDonald vs. Lineker on July 13, 2016. He won the fight via knockout in the first round.

In his third fight for the promotion, Nicholson faced Sam Alvey at UFC Fight Night: dos Anjos vs. Ferguson on November 5, 2016. He lost the fight by unanimous decision.

In his fourth fight for the promotion, Nicholson faced Jack Hermansson at UFC Fight Night: Gustafsson vs. Teixeira on May 28, 2017. He lost the fight via TKO in the first round. Subsequent to this fight, Nicholson was released from the promotion.

Professional Fighters League
In June 2018, Nicholson entered into the $1 million Heavyweight tournament held by Professional Fighters League. He faced |Jake Heun in the opening round at PFL 1 on June 7, 2018. He won the fight via knockout due to a flying knee in the second round. On July 19, Nicholson lost via TKO to Phillipe Lins at PFL 4. In October 2018, Nicholson defeated Jack May by TKO but then lost later that night via KO to Josh Copeland. 

In June 2019, Nicholson entered the second season of PFL's Heavyweight tournament and lost a decision to Francimar Barroso. In August, he defeated Zeke Tuinei-Wiley. On October 31, Nicholson lost a rematch against Barroso again by decision. In December 2019, Nicholson was suspended by the Nevada State Athletic Commission for four years due to testing positive for three steroids.

Regional circuit
Nicholson was scheduled to headline Gamebred FC 2 against Antônio Silva on September 11, 2021. However, Silva's prevailing contract with Eagle Fighting Championship prevented him from competing at the event and he was initially replaced by Jack May.  In turn, May tested positive for COVID-19 and was replaced by Jonathan Ivey. Furthermore, the event was postponed to take place on October 1, 2021, in order to ensure housing for those impacted of Hurricane Ida. He won the bout via TKO in the first round.

Nicholson faced Tony Lopez on December 17, 2021 at Gamebred FC 3. He won the bout via KO in the first round.

Nicholson faced Oscar Sosa for the Titan FC Heavyweight Championship on July 29, 2022 at Titan FC 78. He won the bout and title via anaconda choke in the first round.

Professional boxing
Nicholson made his professional boxing debut in 2015, a KO win. He fought again two months later and lost via KO to Simon Kean.

Personal life
Nicholson has a son, Odin (born 2017) with fellow mixed martial artist Hannah Goldy.

In 2016, Nicholson faced criticism for the racially-charged comments he made while cornering teammate Mike Perry in his bout against South Korean fighter Hyun Gyu Lim. During the fight, Nicholson was recorded shouting "He [Lim] can't even open his motherfucking eyes." The UFC issued a formal statement that any future racially derogatory remarks by Nicholson "could result in a suspension from competition, or termination of his contract." Prior to the fight, Nicholson made a Facebook post where he referred to Lim as "dung him Kong Jung foo" and claimed Perry would "rip [Lim's] limbs off."

Mixed martial arts record

|-
|Win
|align=center|17–9
|Oscar Sosa
|Submission (anaconda choke)
|Titan FC 78
|
|align=center|1
|align=center|3:47
|Santo Domingo, Dominican Republic
|
|-
|Win
|align=center|16–9
|Tony Lopez
|KO (knee)
|Gamebred Fighting Championship 3
|
|align=center| 1
|align=center| 1:48
|Biloxi, Mississippi, United States
|
|-
|Win
|align=center|15–9
|Jonathan Ivey
|TKO (knees and elbows)
|Gamebred Fighting Championship 2
|
|align=center| 1
|align=center| 1:56
|Biloxi, Mississippi, United States
|
|-
|Loss
|align=center|14–9
|Francimar Barroso
|Decision (unanimous)
|PFL 9
|
|align=center| 2
|align=center| 5:00
|Las Vegas, Nevada, United States
|
|-
|Win
|align=center|14–8
|Zeke Tuinei-Wily
|TKO (punches)
|PFL 6
|
|align=center| 1
|align=center| 3:07
|Atlantic City, New Jersey, United States
|
|-
|Loss
|align=center|13–8
|Francimar Barroso
|Decision (split)
|PFL 3
|
|align=center| 3
|align=center| 5:00
|Uniondale, New York, United States
|
|-
|Loss
|align=center|13–7
|Josh Copeland
|KO (punch)
| rowspan=2|PFL 8
| rowspan=2|
|align=center|1
|align=center|1:27
| rowspan=2|New Orleans, Louisiana, United States
|
|-
|Win
|align=center| 13–6
|Jack May
|TKO (leg kick and punches)
|align=center|1
|align=center|2:03
|
|- 
|Loss
|align=center|12–6
|Philipe Lins
|TKO (punches)
|PFL 4
|
|align=center| 2
|align=center| 3:39
|Uniondale, New York, United States 
| 
|-
|Win
|align=center| 12–5
|Jake Heun
|KO (flying knee)
|PFL 1
|
|align=center|2
|align=center|0:58
|New York City, New York, United States
| 
|- 
| Win
| align=center| 11–5
| Ricco Rodriguez
| TKO (submission to punches)
| AFC 24: CamSoda Legends
| 
| align=center|1
| align=center|1: 27
| Fort Lauderdale, Florida, United States
|Return to Heavyweight.
|-                              
|Loss
|align=center|10–5
|Ryan Spann
|KO (punches)
|Legacy Fighting Alliance 32 
|
|align=center|1
|align=center|4:24
|Lake Charles, Louisiana, United States
|For LFA Light Heavyweight Championship.
|-
|Win
|align=center|10–4
|Daniel Madrid
|TKO (punches)
|Iron Boy MMA 9 
|
|align=center|1
|align=center|1:42
|Phoenix, Arizona, United States
|Middleweight bout.
|-
|Win
|align=center|9–4
|Chris Barnett
|KO (elbow)
|Island Fights 42
|
|align=center|1
|align=center|0:40
|Pensacola, Florida, United States
|
|-
|Win
|align=center|8–4
|Demoreo Dennis
|KO (elbow)
|Next Level Fight Club 8
|
|align=center|1
|align=center|1:06
|Raleigh, North Carolina, United States
|Return to Heavyweight.
|-
|Loss
|align=center|7–4
|Jack Hermansson
|TKO (punches)
|UFC Fight Night: Gustafsson vs. Teixeira
|
|align=center|1
|align=center|2:00
|Stockholm, Sweden
| 
|-
|Loss
|align=center|7–3
|Sam Alvey
|Decision (unanimous)
|UFC Fight Night: dos Anjos vs. Ferguson
|
|align=center|3
|align=center|5:00
|Mexico City, Mexico
|
|-
| Win
| align=center| 7–2
| Devin Clark
| KO (punch)
| UFC Fight Night: McDonald vs. Lineker
| 
| align=center| 1
| align=center| 4:57
| Sioux Falls, South Dakota, United States
|Return to Middleweight.
|-
| Loss
| align=center| 6–2
| Misha Cirkunov
| Submission (neck crank)
| UFC Fight Night: Hendricks vs. Thompson
| 
| align=center| 2
| align=center| 1:28
| Las Vegas, Nevada, United States
|Light Heavyweight bout.
|-
| Win
| align=center| 6–1
| Chaz Morgan
| TKO
| Island Fights 34
| 
| align=center| 1
| align=center| 4:03
| Pensacola, Florida, United States 
|Won Island Fights Heavyweight Championship.
|-
| Win
| align=center| 5–1
| Dillon Cleckler
| KO (spinning back fist)
| Island Fights 33
| 
| align=center| 2
| align=center| 1:34
| Pensacola, Florida, United States
| 
|-
| Win
| align=center| 4–1
| Ronnie Phillips
| TKO (head kick and punches)
| Florida Championship Fighting
| 
| align=center| 1
| align=center| 4:08
| Fern Park, Florida, United States
|Light Heavyweight bout.
|-
| Win
| align=center| 3–1
| Chase Sherman
| TKO (spinning back fist)
| Island Fights 31
| 
| align=center| 1
| align=center| N/A
| Pensacola, Florida, United States
|Heavyweight debut.
|-
|  Win
| align=center| 2–1
| Derrick Brown
| Submission (neck crank)
| Top Alliance Combat 3
| 
| align=center| 1
| align=center| 4:56
| McDonough, Georgia, United States
|Light Heavyweight debut.
|-
| Loss
| align=center| 1–1
| Mark Inge
| Decision (unanimous)
| Top Alliance Combat 1
| 
| align=center| 3
| align=center| 5:00
| McDonough, Georgia, United States
|
|-
| Win
| align=center| 1–0
| Baraq Hunter
| KO 
| Island Fights 27
| 
| align=center| 1
| align=center| 0:37
| Pensacola, Florida, United States
|

Professional boxing record

References

External links
 
 

1990 births
Living people
Sportspeople from Orange County, Florida
American male mixed martial artists
Middleweight mixed martial artists
Mixed martial artists from Florida
Mixed martial artists utilizing taekwondo
Mixed martial artists utilizing boxing
Mixed martial artists utilizing Muay Thai
Mixed martial artists utilizing Brazilian jiu-jitsu
People from Apopka, Florida
American male taekwondo practitioners
American male boxers
American Muay Thai practitioners
American practitioners of Brazilian jiu-jitsu
Ultimate Fighting Championship male fighters